Kheleturi is a rural locality (a selo) and the administrative centre of Kheleturinsky Selsoviet, Botlikhsky District, Republic of Dagestan, Russia. The population was 721 as of 2010. There are 9 streets.

Geography 
Kheleturi is located 11 km south of Botlikh (the district's administrative centre) by road. Alak is the nearest rural locality.

References 

Rural localities in Botlikhsky District